Balluana Assembly constituency (Sl. No.: 82) is a Punjab Legislative Assembly constituency in Fazilka district, Punjab state, India.

Members of Legislative Assembly

Election Results

2022

2017

2007

1985

Previous results

See also 
 List of constituencies of the Punjab Legislative Assembly
 Fazilka district
 Abohar Assembly constituency
 Firozpur (Lok Sabha constituency)
 2019 Indian general election in Punjab

References

External links
  

Assembly constituencies of Punjab, India
Fazilka district